The 1956 Tour de Romandie was the tenth edition of the Tour de Romandie cycle race and was held from 10 May to 13 May 1956. The race started and finished in Geneva. The race was won by Pasquale Fornara.

General classification

References

1956
Tour de Romandie